The Nottingham 1936 chess tournament was a 15-player round robin tournament held August 10–28 at the University of Nottingham. It was one of the strongest of all time.

Dr. J. Hannak wrote in his 1959 biography of Emanuel Lasker that "when it comes to awarding the plum for 'the greatest chess tournament ever', in 1936, the Nottingham Tournament was certainly just that". W. H. Watts in the Introduction to the tournament book called Nottingham 1936 "the most important chess event the world has so far seen".

It is one of the very few tournaments in chess history to include five past, present, or future world champions (Lasker, José Raúl Capablanca, Alekhine, Euwe and Botvinnik). A number of other prominent players, such as Reuben Fine, Samuel Reshevsky and Salo Flohr, were in the tournament.

According to the unofficial Chessmetrics ratings, the tournament was (as of March 2005) one of only six tournaments in history that had the top eight players in the world playing. (Chessmetrics gives the top eight at the time as, in order: Euwe, Botvinnik, Alekhine, Flohr, Capablanca, Reshevsky, Fine, Bogoljubow).

The event is also notable for being Lasker's last major event, and for Botvinnik achieving the first Soviet success outside the Soviet Union.

In parallel with the main tournament, the venue also played host to the 1936 British Women's Championship. The event was won by Edith Holloway (1868-1956), age sixty-eight and a former winner in 1919.

Results
{| class="wikitable" style="text-align:left;"
|+ Nottingham 1936
!#!!Player !!01!!02!!03!!04!!05!!06!!07!!08!!09!!10!!11!!12!!13!!14!!15!!Score
|-
| 1||align=left| 
|x||½||½||½||½||½||½||½||1||1||1||1||1||1||½|| 10
|-
| 2||align=left|  
|½||x||½||½||1||1||0||½||1||½||½||1||1||1||1|| 10
|-
| 3||align=left|  
|½||½||x||½||1||0||½||0||1||½||1||1||1||1||1|| 9½
|-
| 4||align=left|  
|½||½||½||x||½||½||½||1||½||1||½||1||1||½||1|| 9½
|-
| 5||align=left|  
|½||0||0||½||x||1||½||1||1||1||½||1||1||1||½|| 9½
|-
| 6||align=left|   
|½||0||1||½||0||x||1||½||½||1||1||½||1||½||1|| 9
|-
| 7||align=left|   
|½||1||½||½||½||0||x||1||1||1||½||0||0||1||1|| 8½
|-
| 8||align=left| 
|½||½||1||0||0||½||0||x||½||1||½||1||1||1||1|| 8½
|-
| 9||align=left| 
|0||0||0||½||0||½||0||½||x||1||½||½||1||½||1|| 6
|-
|10||align=left|   
|0||½||½||0||0||0||0||0||0||x||½||1||1||1||1|| 5½
|-
|11||align=left|   
|0||½||0||½||½||0||½||½||½||½||x||0||0||1||1|| 5½
|-
|12||align=left|  
|0||0||0||0||0||½||1||0||½||0||1||x||½||½||½|| 4½
|-
|13||align=left|  
|0||0||0||0||0||0||1||0||0||0||1||½||x||½||½||  3½
|-
|14||align=left|  
|0||0||0||½||0||½||0||0||½||0||0||½||½||x||½|| 3
|-
|15||align=left|  
|½||0||0||0||½||0||0||0||0||0||0||½||½||½||x|| 2½
|}

References

External links
Nottingham 1936 on Chessgames.com
“Photographs of Nottingham, 1936” by Edward Winter

Chess competitions
Chess in England
1936 in chess
1936 in English sport
Sport in Nottingham
20th century in Nottingham